Evitts Creek may refer to:

Evitts Creek, Maryland, an unincorporated community
Evitts Creek (North Branch Potomac River), a tributary of the North Branch Potomac River